The Federal Office Building in the West Village of Manhattan, New York City, also known as United States Appraisers' Warehouse, was built between 1892–99.  It was listed on the National Register of Historic Places in 1974.
It is a ten-story Romanesque style building bounded by Christopher, Greenwich, Barrow, and Washington Streets, about four blocks west of Sheridan Square. The building's architect, Willoughby J. Edbrooke, left his successful Chicago practice on being named Supervising Architect of the Treasury in 1891. He died before the completion of the building, but his influence and the influence of the Chicago School of Architecture is evident.

History
The construction of the building was authorized by Congress in 1888. Construction began under the direction of supervising architect Edbrooke in 1892, comprising the first two floors of the building. This work was completed in 1894. An additional eight floors were added during the years 1896 to 1898, under the direction of William Martin Aiken, supervising architect from 1895 to 1897. Construction was completed in 1898 by his successor, James Knox Taylor. The building served as a storehouse, in which customs agents would examine and assess imported goods to set valuations and duties. The building was used to this end until the 1930s, when the government converted it into an office building, the United States Federal Building. This housed offices of several government agencies, including the National Archives and Records Administration. These agencies moved out in the 1970s and 1980s, and the building was sold to the Urban Development Corporation in 1982 and leased to Rockrose Partners. The building was converted for residential uses, and is now known as The Archive, after its former tenant. This work was completed in 1988, the architects for the conversion being Warner, Burns, Toan, Lunde.

References

External links

Government buildings on the National Register of Historic Places in Manhattan
Government buildings completed in 1892
New York City Designated Landmarks in Manhattan
Chicago school architecture in New York (state)
West Village